WCUW (91.3 FM) is a community radio station licensed to Worcester, Massachusetts, United States. The station, which broadcasts at 91.3 FM, is owned by WCUW, Inc., a nonprofit organization.  WCUW is managed by a professional staff, while all of its programs are hosted by community volunteers.

Station history 
WCUW began as a carrier-current AM station in one of the upper rooms of Atwood Hall on Clark University campus. The station was started by Robert Goddard in 1920. Goddard was at that time a part-time Clark University physics instructor and researcher. He later went on to launch the first rocket and become known as 'the founder of modern rocketry'. While Goddard started the station in Atwood Hall, it later moved into a new office in the basement of Sanford Hall. This AM station could only be heard on campus and operated on 10 Watts. In May 1972 the AM station ceased broadcasting. In the fall of 1972, an effort was begun to establish an FM station under the same WCUW callsign.

WCUW, as an FM station, was started in a Clark University dorm room in Sanford Hall in 1973, sanctioned by the university but under a local organization, WUW, Inc., the predecessor to WCUW, Inc.  In 1976 there was a radio watt leap for stations. A sanction was put in place where radio stations either needed to increase their wattage or get kicked off the air. In 1976 the WCUW increased to 100 Watts covering all of the Worcester area as well as several surrounding communities.

The station quickly gained a national reputation for its eclectic programming, and by 1977, WCUW had a staff of nine employees and a budget of $130,000. During this time period WCUW introduced public affairs programming for Worcester's Hispanic community. WCUW broadcast approximately 20 hours of Hispanic programming each week including the United Press International news dispatches from South America. This was one of the most significant community outreach programs WCUW has ever done.

In 1979, the station received a power increase and through federal funding, purchased a new transmitter, as well as studio and remote broadcasting equipment.  Relations with the university began to deteriorate, and in 1980, the station left the campus for new facilities on Worcester's Main Street. In 1985 WCUW signed a rebroadcast agreement with Bay Path WBPV. The agreement allowed WCUW to broadcast at 1,000 Watts gaining the territory of Southern Massachusetts, to parts of 495; to Warwick, Rhode Island; to Nashua, New Hampshire. Unfortunately, the WCUW community station programmers, known to play controversial music, were not well received and so in 1991 the rebroadcast agreement with Bay Path was not renewed and was officially disbanded. WCUW went back to its original 630 Watts and as more stations gained wattage, the community of listeners has decreased to solely the Worcester area. The station struggled over the next few decades and was forced to lay off staff, but still managed to buy its building and maintain operations with volunteer committees.

WCUW celebrated its 40-year anniversary on October 19–20, 2014. According to executive director, Troy Tyree, WCUW currently hosts 70 programs in 12 different languages.

See also
List of community radio stations in the United States

References

External links

About Clark University

WCUW jazz festivals

Clark University
CUW
Community radio stations in the United States
CUW
Radio stations established in 1973
1973 establishments in Massachusetts
Community radio stations
Mass media in Worcester, Massachusetts
Local mass media in Massachusetts